The Gay Science, sometimes translated as The Joyful Wisdom or The Joyous Science, is a book by Friedrich Nietzsche published in 1882, and followed by a second edition in 1887 after the completion of Thus Spoke Zarathustra and Beyond Good and Evil. This substantial expansion includes the addition of a fifth book to the existing four books of The Gay Science, as well as an appendix of songs. It was described by Nietzsche as "the most personal of all my books", and contains more poems than any of his other works.

Title

The book's title, in the original German and in translation, uses a phrase that was well known at the time in many European cultures and had specific meaning.

One of its earliest literary uses is in Rabelais's Gargantua and Pantagruel ("gai sçavoir"). It was derived from a Provençal expression (gai saber) for the technical skill required for poetry-writing. The expression proved durable and was used as late as 19th century American English by Ralph Waldo Emerson and E. S. Dallas. It was also used in deliberately inverted form, by Thomas Carlyle in "the dismal science", to criticize the emerging discipline of economics by comparison with poetry.

The book's title was first translated into English as The Joyful Wisdom, but The Gay Science has become the common translation since Walter Kaufmann's version in the 1960s. Kaufmann cites The Shorter Oxford English Dictionary (1955) that lists "The gay science (Provençal gai saber): the art of poetry."

In Ecce Homo, Nietzsche refers to the poems in the Appendix of The Gay Science, saying they were

This alludes to the birth of modern European poetry that occurred in Provence around the 11th century, whereupon, after the culture of the troubadours fell into almost complete desolation and destruction due to the Albigensian Crusade (1209–1229), other poets in the 14th century ameliorated and thus cultivated the gai saber or gaia scienza. In a similar vein, in Beyond Good and Evil Nietzsche observed that,

The original English translation as Joyful Wisdom is more comprehensible to the modern reader given the contrasting modern English meanings of "gay" and "science". The German fröhlich can be translated "happy" or "joyful", cognate to the original meanings of "gay" in English and other languages. However Wissenschaft is not "wisdom" (wisdom = Weisheit), but a propensity toward any rigorous practice of a poised, controlled, and disciplined quest for knowledge. The common English translation “science" is misleading if it suggests natural sciences — clearly inappropriate in this case, where “scholarship” is preferable, implying humanities.

Content
The book is usually placed within Nietzsche's middle period, during which his work extolled the merits of science, skepticism, and intellectual discipline as routes to mental freedom. In The Gay Science, Nietzsche experiments with the notion of power but does not advance any systematic theory.

Amor fati 
The affirmation of the Provençal tradition (invoked through the book's title) is also one of a joyful "yea-saying" to life. Nietzsche's love of fate naturally leads him to confront the reality of suffering in a radical way. For to love that which is necessary demands not only that we love the bad along with the good, but that we view the two as inextricably linked. In section 3 of the preface, he writes:Only great pain is the ultimate liberator of the spirit….I doubt that such pain makes us ‘better’; but I know that it makes us more profound.This is representative of amor fati, the general outlook on life that he articulates in section 276 :I want to learn more and more to see as beautiful what is necessary in things; then I shall be one of those who makes things beautiful. Amor fati: let that be my love henceforth! I do not want to wage war against what is ugly. I do not want to accuse; I do not even want to accuse those who accuse. Looking away shall be my only negation. And all in all and on the whole: some day I wish to be only a Yes-sayer.

Eternal recurrence 
The book contains Nietzsche's first consideration of the idea of the eternal recurrence, a concept which would become critical in his next work Thus Spoke Zarathustra and underpins much of the later works.

"God is dead" 
Here is also the first occurrence of the famous formulation "God is dead", first in section 108.

Section 125 depicts The Parable of the Madman who is searching for God. He accuses us all of being the murderers of God. "'Where is God?' he cried; 'I will tell you. We have killed him—you and I. All of us are his murderers..."

Notes

References
 Kaufmann, Walter, Nietzsche: Philosopher, Psychologist, Antichrist, Princeton University Press, 1974.
 The Gay Science: With a Prelude in Rhymes and an Appendix of Songs by Friedrich Nietzsche; translated, with commentary, by Walter Kaufmann. Vintage Books, 1974, 
 Pérez, Rolando. Towards a Genealogy of the Gay Science: From Toulouse and Barcelona to Nietzsche and Beyond. eHumanista/IVITRA. Volume 5, 2014.

External links 

Die fröhliche Wissenschaft at Nietzsche Source
Oscar Levy's 1924 English edition, trans. Thomas Common at the Internet Archive
 The Parable of the Madman (Friedrich Nietzsche, The Gay Science (1882, 1887) para. 125; Walter Kaufmann ed. (New York: Vintage, 1974), pp. 181–182.)
 

1882 non-fiction books
Books by Friedrich Nietzsche
Ethics books
Existentialist books